Lisronagh is a village in County Tipperary, in Ireland.

Location
It is one half of the Roman Catholic parish of Powerstown and Lisronagh in the diocese of Waterford and Lismore. It is in the barony of Iffa and Offa East. It is located on the R689 regional road 7 km north of Clonmel, and 6 km south of Fethard.

History
Lisronagh has been inhabited since at least the medieval period, and was held by the Anglo-Norman de Burgh family from the time of Henry II. A rare surviving document, the rental of the manor of Lisronagh, dates to 1333 and describes the local lord's landholdings, the rents owed by local tenants, and the rights which the village's inhabitants possessed. The powerful Butler family built a tower house in the village in the 16th century, which survives now in a ruinous condition. By the early 19th century, Lisronagh had a population of 981.

Horse racing
Lisronagh is also home to the Lisronagh Point to Point race.  It takes place annually at Lisronagh on a right handed, mainly flat track, with a slight up hill finish. The Clonmel Agricultural Show owns the track,  and it is leased to the Tipperary Foxhounds.

People
Thomas Walsh, discoverer of one of the largest gold mines in the USA.

See also
 List of towns and villages in Ireland

References

External links
 Parish of Powerstown & Lisronagh website

Parishes of the Roman Catholic Diocese of Waterford and Lismore
Towns and villages in County Tipperary
Civil parishes of Iffa and Offa East